There have been a number of 21-inch torpedoes in service with the United States. These have been used on ships and submarines of the U.S. Navy.

Ship classes that carried 21-inch torpedoes include:

Allen M. Sumner-class destroyers
Atlanta-class cruisers
Bagley-class destroyers
Balao-class submarines
Barbel-class submarines
Barracuda-class submarines
Benham-class destroyers
Benjamin Franklin-class submarines
Benson-class destroyers
Cachalot-class submarines
Caldwell-class destroyers
Cassin-class destroyers
Chester-class cruisers
Clemson-class destroyers
Colorado-class battleships
Connecticut-class battleships
Dealey-class destroyer escorts
Ethan Allen-class submarines
Farragut-class destroyers
Forrest Sherman-class destroyers
Fletcher-class destroyers
Gato-class submarines
Gearing-class destroyers
George Washington-class submarines
Gleaves-class destroyers
Glenard P. Lipscomb-class submarine
Grayback-class submarines
Gridley-class destroyers
Halibut-class submarine
James Madison-class submarines
John C. Butler-class destroyer escorts
Lafayette-class submarines
Lexington-class battlecruisers - canceled
Los Angeles-class submarines
Mahan-class destroyers
Mitscher-class destroyer leaders
Narwhal-class submarine
Nautilus-class submarine
Norfolk-class destroyer leader
O'Brien-class destroyers
Ohio-class submarines
Omaha-class cruisers
Permit-class submarines
Porter-class destroyers
PT boats
R-class submarines
Rudderow-class destroyer escorts
S-class submarines
Sailfish-class submarines
Sampson-class destroyers
Sargo-class submarines
Seawolf-class submarine (1957)
Seawolf-class submarines (1997)
Sims-class destroyers
Skate-class submarines
Skipjack-class submarines
Somers-class destroyers
South Dakota-class battleships - canceled
Sturgeon-class submarines
T-1-class submarines
Tambor-class submarines
Tang-class submarines
Tench-class submarines
Tennessee-class cruisers
Tucker-class destroyers
Tullibee-class submarine
V-boat submarines
Virginia-class battleships
Virginia-class submarines
Wickes-class destroyers

See also
American 18-inch torpedo

External links
Torpedo history, part 2, Naval History & Heritage Command
Navweaps links: US Torpedoes main page, Pre-World War II, Post-World War II

Torpedoes
World War I naval weapons
World War II naval weapons
Torpedoes of the United States
Unmanned underwater vehicles